Timothy DiDuro (born August 2, 1971) an American hard rock drummer. DiDuro played drums for the bands Skid Row and Slaughter.

Biography
Born in Geneva, New York, DiDuro learned to play drums at age 5. He played with various local bands during high school. He moved to Orlando, Florida in 1991 and played with Andrew "Duck" MacDonald in the band Playground for 5 years.

He joined The Kill in 1997. In 1998, The Kill won a contest called "Kick Start Your Career,"  which was a Battle of the Bands-type competition that the band Mötley Crüe was sponsoring; one winner in each city got to open for the Mötley Crüe show - The Kill opened in Orlando. The Kill also won the 1998 Orlando Music Awards for best Metal Band. They released one album  on Forbidden Records in 1998. He then played with Brizz (one of the original founding member of the band Lyte Funky Ones[LFO]) from 2001-2003.

In early 2004, he replaced Skid Row's drummer Phil Varone, who had abruptly left the band. He also appeared in the Skid Row video "Ghost." In late 2004, he auditioned for Slaughter and, although he was never given the job, he played with them until 2011 as their temporary touring drummer.

He has also played with Vince Neil, and with Mark Slaughter's band Scrap Metal. Scrap Metal consists of Mark Slaughter and other platinum-selling singers such as Gunnar Nelson (Nelson) and Eric Martin (Mr. Big).

DiDuro currently plays drums with Pipestone, which is a five piece heavy rock band from the Florida area. Collectively the band members have had 5 number one radio hits and have toured the United States extensively with other projects. The band recorded their first CD with producer Brett Hestla.

DiDuro currently plays Pearl drums, having previously endorsed DW.  He also uses Remo drumheads and Sabian cymbals, also having been seen previously with the likes of Zildjian and Meinl.

Discography
The Kill
 Superdragsmackheadpsychoplasticgogopunk (1998)

See also
 Slaughter
 Skid Row

References

External links
 DiDuro on MySpace
 Slaughter show review

American rock drummers
Glam metal musicians
Slaughter (band) members
Skid Row (American band) members
Living people
1971 births
People from Geneva, New York
20th-century American drummers
American male drummers
21st-century American drummers